Viktor Niitsoo (born 12 March 1952 Kuressaare) is an Estonian politician, Soviet dissident and historian. He was a member of VII Riigikogu.

References

Living people
1952 births
20th-century Estonian historians
Estonian dissidents
Estonian National Independence Party politicians
Members of the Riigikogu, 1992–1995
Members of the Riigikogu, 1995–1999
University of Tartu alumni
People from Kuressaare